Floyd James "Busher" Curry (August 11, 1925 – September 16, 2006) was a Canadian ice hockey right winger.

Curry was born in 1925 in Chapleau, Ontario and raised in Kirkland Lake by his parents Dalton and Mable Curry. He played junior hockey with the Oshawa Generals and starred for the team. Curry won the Memorial Cup in 1944 with the Generals. The Montreal Canadiens realized his potential and signed him. He played for the Montreal Royals before being brought up to the Canadiens.

Curry played his entire National Hockey League career with the Montreal Canadiens. His career started in 1947 and ended in 1958. During his time with Montreal, Curry won four Stanley Cups in 1953, 1956, 1957, and 1958.

Curry recorded his only career hat trick on October 29, 1951, a night when Princess Elizabeth, soon to become Queen Elizabeth II, was in attendance at the Montreal Forum.

After retiring as a player, Curry coached the Montreal Royals, then went on to work for the Canadiens' front office for over forty years, starting out as director of sales and travel secretary. In the summer of 1968, he was promoted to assistant general manager. During the summer of 1970 Curry became the manager-coach of the Montreal Voyageurs, replacing Al MacNeil who was promoted to assistant coach (later coach) of the Montreal Canadiens. MacNeil returned to become manager-coach of the Voyageurs, now the Nova Scotia Voyageurs, in the summer of 1971, after winning the Stanley Cup. Curry returned to the Canadiens as assistant general manager. He remained in that position until 1978, and then stayed on with Montreal as director of scouting for a couple more years. During his time in Montreal in management and scouting, Curry was awarded Stanley Cup rings in 1969, 1973, 1976, 1977, 1978, and 1979. Curry's name was added to the Cup in 1977 and 1978.

Curry died at a Montreal hospital on September 16, 2006. He was survived by his wife of 61 years, June, and his two daughters.

Career statistics

See also
list of NHL players who spent their entire career with one franchise

External links

Picture of Floyd Curry's name on the 1958 Stanley Cup plaque
Former Canadien Curry dies at 81

1925 births
2006 deaths
Buffalo Bisons (AHL) players
Canadian ice hockey right wingers
Ice hockey people from Ontario
Ice hockey people from Montreal
Montreal Canadiens executives
Montreal Canadiens players
Oshawa Generals players
People from Chapleau, Ontario
Rochester Americans players
Stanley Cup champions